Theodore Rosevelt "Teddy" Wilson (December 10, 1943 – July 21, 1991) was an American stage, film, and television actor. He is best known for his recurring roles as Earl the Postman on the ABC sitcom That's My Mama, and Sweet Daddy Williams on the CBS sitcom Good Times and Phil Wheeler on Sanford Arms (1977).

Career 
Born in Harlem, New York City, Wilson studied music at Florida A&M University before switching to drama. Upon returning to New York, he joined the Negro Ensemble Company and later worked with the Arena Stage Repertory. He made his acting debut in the blaxploitation film, Cotton Comes to Harlem, in 1970. The following year, Wilson left New York City and moved to Los Angeles to further his acting career. He made his television debut in a two-episode role as Hawthorne Dooley on the television series The Waltons.
In 1973, Wilson was cast as the character High Strung on the CBS sitcom Roll Out. The series was canceled after 12 episodes.
The following year, Wilson was cast as Earl Chambers, a postman on the sitcom That's My Mama. That series ran for two seasons on ABC. Wilson also starred in national TV commercials for Aamco in the 1970s as a character named "Walter T." Wilson appeared as CWO2 Martin H. Williams, a chopper pilot and buddy of characters Trapper and Hawkeye in the Season 3 episode of M*A*S*H titled "The General Flipped at Dawn" (1974).

In September 1976, Wilson was offered and signed a contract with Tandem Productions, the production company owned by Bud Yorkin and Norman Lear, who produced some of the most popular television sitcoms of the 1970s. Wilson went on to guest star in several Yorkin/Lear-produced series including All in the Family, Sanford and Son, What's Happening!!, The Jeffersons, and 13 Queens Boulevard. In 1976, Wilson was cast as Sweet Daddy Williams, a street hustler on the CBS sitcom Good Times. His character of Sweet Daddy appeared in a recurring role. In August 1977, it was announced that Wilson would star in a spin-off series of the hit sitcom Sanford and Son called Sanford Arms. Sanford and Son had ended in March 1977 when star Redd Foxx left the series. Sanford Arms was intended to be a continuation of that highly popular series. In Sanford Arms, Wilson starred as Phil Wheeler, an Army veteran and widower who has purchased the Sanford Arms, a rooming house, from his old Army buddy Fred G. Sanford, the Foxx character from Sanford and Son. Upon its premiere in September 1977, Sanford Arms was met with low ratings and was canceled after four episodes.

After the series was canceled, Wilson made various TV guest appearances in episodes of The White Shadow (he also wrote a 1980 episode), Enos, Gimme a Break!, The Golden Girls, and What's Happening Now. In 1986, he had a role as Jim-Jam on another short-lived series, The Redd Foxx Show. Wilson continued to work throughout the late 1980s and early 1990s, appearing in Alien Nation, Dallas, Family Matters, Tales from the Crypt, Gabriel's Fire, Mama's Family, and Quantum Leap. He was also featured in several motion pictures including The Hunter (1980), Blake Edwards's A Fine Mess, That's Life! (both 1986), and Mel Brooks's Life Stinks (1991). Wilson made his last onscreen appearance in Blood In Blood Out, a 1993 crime drama released after his death.

Personal life 
Wilson had two children with actress Joan Pringle. Wilson and Pringle were co-stars together during the second season of the television series That's My Mama. Pringle was named executrix of Wilson's estate when he died in 1991.

Death 
On July 21, 1991, Wilson died of complications from a stroke at Cedars-Sinai Medical Center in Los Angeles, at the age of 47. He had undergone open-heart surgery several years prior to his death.

Filmography

References

External links 

1943 births
1991 deaths
20th-century American male actors
African-American male actors
American male film actors
American male stage actors
American male television actors
Florida A&M University alumni
Male actors from New York City
People from Harlem
20th-century African-American people